Kajazun Gyurjyan (1 January 1923 – 13 February 2022) was an Armenian stage actor.

Life and career
Gyurjyan was born in the village of Vostan, Artashat Region on 1 January 1923, and graduated from the local secondary school. From 1941 to 1972 he was an actor at the Amo Kharazyan State Theater in Artashat, from 1974 to 1985 he was an actor at the Yerevan Young Audience Theater, and from 1995 he was an actor at the Hakob Paronyan State Theater of Musical Comedy.

He died in Artashat on 13 February 2022, at the age of 99.

Awards
 Honored Artist of Armenia
 Medal of the 1st Degree for Services to the Motherland (2013)

References

1923 births
2022 deaths
20th-century Armenian male actors
Armenian male stage actors
People from Ararat Province